Gandhi Azad a senior politician from Bahujan Samaj Party was a Member of the Parliament of India representing Uttar Pradesh in the Rajya Sabha  the upper house of the Indian Parliament twice from 1996-2002,2002-2008

External links
 Profile on Rajya Sabha website

Rajya Sabha members from Uttar Pradesh
Living people
Bahujan Samaj Party politicians from Uttar Pradesh
Year of birth missing (living people)